In computing, Xerces is Apache's collection of software libraries for parsing, validating, serializing and manipulating XML. The library implements a number of standard APIs for XML parsing, including DOM, SAX and SAX2. The implementation is available in the Java, C++ and Perl programming languages.

The name "Xerces" is believed to commemorate the extinct Xerces blue butterfly (Glaucopsyche xerces).

Xerces language versions 
There are several language versions of the Xerces parser:
 Xerces2 Java, the Java reference implementation
 Xerces C++, a C++ implementation
 Xerces Perl, a Perl implementation. This implementation is a wrapper around the C++ API.

Features 
The features supported by Xerces depend on the language, the Java version having the most features.

See also
Apache License
Java XML
Apache Xalan

References

Notes
 Implemented third edition.
 Implemented second edition. Section 2.13 Normalization Checking has not been implemented.
 Implemented first edition.
 Implemented first edition.

External links
Apache Xerces Project home

Xerces
C++ libraries
Java (programming language) libraries
Java platform
Software using the Apache license
XML parsers